Mats Bergman (born 5 May 1948) is a Swedish actor.

He is the son of director Ingmar Bergman and Ellen Lundström, twin brother of actress Anna Bergman, and a half-brother of Swedish-Norwegian author Linn Ullmann.

Biography
Bergman graduated from Sweden's National Theatre Academy (Scenskolan) in Stockholm in 1971. Since 1987 he has been a stage actor at Sweden's Royal Dramatic Theatre, and has also appeared at Stockholm City Theatre and Norrbottensteatern. He has acted in Almqvist's Drottningens juvelsmycke, Bulgakov's Mästaren och Margarita (The Master and Margarita), Brecht's Tolvskillingsoperan (The Threepenny Opera), Botho Strauss' Rummet och tiden, Molière's Misantropen (Le Misanthrope) and Brecht's Den goda människan i Sezuan (The Good Person of Szechwan). He has also performed frequently in theatre productions for children, most recently in the adaption of Elsa Beskow's children's story Petter och Lotta på stora landsvägen (2005 & 2006).

Bergman has gained a reputation as a character actor. He has appeared in TV and film roles in a number of well-known productions, including as Aron in Fanny and Alexander, and as a cigar-loving salesman in Kan du vissla Johanna? (1994), traditionally shown each Christmas Eve in Sweden. He has also played the antique expert Erik Johansson in TV series Berlinder auktioner (2003) and a teacher in the Swedish film Ondskan (Evil), in 2003.

More recently he has been playing the dry-witted forensic detective Nyberg in the Swedish crime films about  Det. Insp. Kurt Wallander, with Krister Henriksson in the lead (32 episodes).

Selected filmography
2005–2013 - Wallander (as Nyberg)
2004 - Danslärarens återkomst (TV)
2003 - Ondskan
2003 - Berlinder auktioner (TV-series)
2000 - Födelsedagen
1999 - Hälsoresan – En smal film av stor vikt
1996 - Monopol
1994 - Kan du vissla Johanna?
1992 - En komikers uppväxt (TV-series)
1991 - Den ofrivillige golfaren
1989 - 1939
1989 - Vildanden (aka Ibsen's The Wild Duck) (TV-theatre)
1988 - Gull-Pian
1987 - Träff i helfigur
1982 - Fanny och Alexander
1981 - Drottning Kristina (Queen Kristina) (TV-theatre)

References

External links

1948 births
Living people
Swedish male film actors
Swedish twins
Actors from Gothenburg
Swedish male television actors
Swedish male stage actors
20th-century Swedish male actors
21st-century Swedish male actors